The Conservative Government of the United Kingdom that began in 1922 and ended in 1924 consisted of two ministries: the  Law ministry (from 1922 to 1923) and then the first Baldwin ministry (from 1923 onwards).

The government was led by Bonar Law and Stanley Baldwin, appointed respectively as Prime Minister by King George V.

Cabinets

Law's Cabinet, October 1922 – May 1923

Bonar Law – Prime Minister and Leader of the House of Commons
The Viscount Cave – Lord Hight Chancellor of Great Britain
The Marquess of Salisbury – Lord President of the Council and Chancellor of the Duchy of Lancaster
Stanley Baldwin – Chancellor of the Exchequer
William Clive Bridgeman – Secretary of State for the Home Department
The Marquess Curzon of Kedleston – Secretary of State for Foreign Affairs and Leader of the House of Lords
The Duke of Devonshire – Secretary of State for the Colonies
The Earl of Derby – Secretary of State for War
The Earl Peel – Secretary of State for India
The Viscount Novar – Secretary for Scotland
Leo Amery – First Lord of the Admiralty
Sir Philip Lloyd-Greame – President of the Board of Trade
Sir Robert Sanders – Minister of Agriculture and Fisheries
Edward Frederick Lindley Wood – President of the Board of Education
Sir Anderson Barlow – Minister of Labour
Sir Arthur Griffith-Boscawen – Minister of Health

Changes
April 1923 – Griffith-Boscawen resigned as Minister of Health after losing his seat and was succeeded by Neville Chamberlain.

Baldwin's Cabinet, May 1923 – January 1924

Stanley Baldwin – Prime Minister, Chancellor of the Exchequer and Leader of the House of Commons
The Viscount Cave – Lord High Chancellor of Great Britain
The Marquess of Salisbury – Lord President of the Council
The Viscount Cecil of Chelwood – Lord Keeper of the Privy Seal (Viscount Cecil of Chelwood from 28 December 1923)
William Clive Bridgeman – Secretary of State for the Home Department
The Marquess Curzon of Kedleston – Secretary of State for Foreign Affairs and Leader of the House of Lords
The Duke of Devonshire – Secretary of State for the Colonies
The Earl of Derby – Secretary of State for War
The Earl Peel – Secretary of State for India
Sir Samuel Hoare – Secretary of State for Air
The Viscount Novar – Secretary for Scotland
Leo Amery – First Lord of the Admiralty
Sir Philip Lloyd-Greame – President of the Board of Trade
Sir Robert Sanders – Minister of Agriculture
Edward Frederick Lindley Wood – President of the Board of Education
Sir Anderson Barlow – Minister of Labour
Neville Chamberlain – Minister of Health
Sir William Joynson-Hicks – Financial Secretary to the Treasury
Sir Laming Worthington-Evans – Postmaster-General

Changes
August 1923 – Neville Chamberlain took over from Baldwin as Chancellor of the Exchequer. Sir William Joynson-Hicks succeeded Chamberlain as Minister of Health. Joynson-Hicks' successor as Financial Secretary to the Treasury was not in the Cabinet.

List of ministers
Members of the Cabinet are shown in bold face.

Notes

References 

1922-1924
Government
1920s in the United Kingdom
1922 establishments in the United Kingdom
1924 disestablishments in the United Kingdom
Ministries of George V
Ministry 1
Cabinets established in 1922
Cabinets disestablished in 1924
Interwar Britain
1922 in British politics
1924 in British politics
Bonar Law